Lake Fanny Hooe is a  lake in Keweenaw County, Michigan. The Garden Brook connects Lake Fanny Hooe to Lake Superior,  to the north. The community of Copper Harbor lies to the north west side of the lake. Home to a U.S. Army fort built in 1844, Fort Wilkins Historic State Park is also situated between Lake Fanny Hooe and Lake Superior.

See also 
 List of lakes in Michigan

References

Fanny Hooe
Geography of Keweenaw County, Michigan